The legislative districts of Dinagat Islands are the representations of the province of Dinagat Islands in the Congress of the Philippines. The province is currently represented in the lower house of the Congress through its lone congressional district.

History 

Prior to gaining separate representation, areas now under the jurisdiction of Dinagat Islands were initially represented under the former province of Surigao (1907–1961), Region X (1978–1984) and Surigao del Norte (1961–1972; 1984–2007).

The passage of Republic Act No. 9355 on October 2, 2006 and its subsequent ratification by plebiscite three months later separated seven municipalities from Surigao del Norte's first congressional district to form the new province of Dinagat Islands. The new province first elected its separate representative in the 2007 elections.

Despite Dinagat Islands being nullified as a province by the Supreme Court of the Philippines on February 11, 2010 the decision was not yet rendered final and executory before the May 10, 2010 elections; therefore the Commission on Elections still organized the elections for Dinagat Islands' congressional representative along with its provincial officials. Even after the Supreme Court rendered its original decision final and executory on May 18, 2010, the representatives of the reconfigured first district of Surigao del Norte and the lone district of Dinagat Islands continued to represent their own constituencies.

After the Supreme Court reversed its previous ruling on April 12, 2011, and subsequently upheld with finality the constitutionality of R.A. 9355 and the creation of Dinagat Islands as a province through an Entry of Judgment on October 24, 2012, the separation of Dinagat Islands from Surigao del Norte's first district became permanent.

Lone District 
 Population (2015): 127,152

Notes

See also 
Legislative district of Surigao
Legislative districts of Surigao del Norte

References 

Dinagat Islands
Politics of Dinagat Islands